Lake Valley may refer to:
Lake Valley, California
Lake Valley (Nevada), Lincoln and White Pine Counties, Nevada
Lake Valley Township, Traverse County, Minnesota
Lake Valley, San Juan County, New Mexico
Lake Valley, Sierra County, New Mexico
 Lake Valley, Saskatchewan, Canada